See also the Arboreto Siemoni, a small arboretum within the Arboreti di Vallombrosa.

The Museo e Arboreto Carlo Siemoni is a museum and historic arboretum located in Badia Prataglia, Poppi, Province of Arezzo, Tuscany, Italy.

The arboretum was established in 1846 by Karl Simon (Carlo Siemoni) for Leopold II, Grand Duke of Tuscany, and the museum now occupies the duke's former villa. Today the arboretum contains a good collection of native and non-native trees including the following species:

 Gymnospermae
 Cupressaceae - Calocedrus decurrens, Chamaecyparis lawsoniana, Cupressus arizonica, Juniperus virginiana, Thuja plicata, Thuja occidentalis, Thuja orientalis
 Ginkgoaceae - Ginkgo biloba
 Pinaceae - Abies alba, Abies cephalonica, Abies nebrodensis, Abies pinsapo, Cedrus atlantica, Cedrus deodara, Cedrus libani, Picea excelsa, Picea smithiana, Pinus laricio, Pinus leucodermis, Pinus nigra, Pinus strobus, Pinus wallichiana, Pseudotsuga menziesii
 Taxaceae - Taxus baccata
 Taxodiaceae - Cryptomeria japonica, Sequoia sempervirens, Sequoiadendron giganteum
 Angiospermae
 Aceraceae - Acer campestre, Acer lobelii, Acer opalus, Acer pseudoplatanus, Acer platanoides
 Aquifoliaceae - Ilex aquifolium
 Araliaceae - Hedera helix
 Beulaceae - Alnus glutinosa, Alnus incana, Betula pendula
 Bignoniaceae - Catalpa bignonioides
 Buxaceae - Buxus sempervirens
 Caprifoliaceae - Sambucus nigra, Viburnum lantana, Viburnum tinus
 Celastraceae - Euonymus europaeus, Euonymus latifolius
 Cornaceae - Cornus mas, Cornus sanguinea
 Corylaceae - Corylus avellana, Carpinus betulus, Ostrya carpinifolia
 Ericaceae - Arbutus unedo
 Facaceae - Castanea sativa, Fagus sylvatica, Quercus borealis, Quercus cerris, Quercus petraea, Quercus pubescens, Quercus robur
 Hamamelidaceae - Liquidambar styraciflua
 Hippocastanaceae - Aesculus hippocastanum
 Juglandaceae - Juglans regia, Juglans nigra
 Leguminsosae - Gleditschia triacanthos, Laburnum alpinum, Laburnum anagyroides, Robinia pseudoacacia
 Magnoliaceae - Liriodendron tulipifera
 Meliaceae - Melia azedarach
 Malvaceae - Hibiscus syriacus
 Oleaceae - Fraxinus excelsior, Fraxinus ornus, Syringa vulgaris
 Platanaceae - Platanus acerifolia, Platanus orientalis
 Rosaceae - Chaenomeles japonica, Eryobotrya japonica, Malus domestica, Mespilus germanica, Prunus avium, Prunus cerasifera, Prunus communis, Prunus spinosa, Sorbus aria, Sorbus domestica, Sorbus torminalis
 Rutaceae - Zanthoxylum simulans
 Salicaceae - Populus tremula, Populus alba, Salix alba, Salix caprea, Salix matsudana, Salix purpurea, Salix viminalis
 Saxifragaceae - Philadelphus coronarius
 Tiliaceae - Tilia platyphyllos
 Ulmaceae - Celtis australis, Ulmus minor, Ulmus glabra, Ulmus laevis

See also 
 List of botanical gardens in Italy

References 
 Museo e Arboreto Carlo Siemoni
 Parco delle foreste casentinesi (Italian)
 Arezzo Notizie description (Italian)
 Istituto e Museo di Storia della Scienza description (Italian)
 G. Gremoli, A. Zoccola, P. Menegol, "L'arboreto 'Carlo Siemoni' di Badia Prataglia (Arezzo). Un originale impianto ottocentesco per l'acclimatazione di specie arboree esotiche di interesse forestale", in Abstracts del 93° Congresso della Società Botanica Italiana, 1–3 October 1998, Cosenza, 1998, p. 142.
 G. Crudele, A. Zoccola, C. Panteri, "La collezione dendrologica 'C. Siemoni' di Badia Prataglia", Museologia scientifica, 2003.

Botanical gardens in Italy
Museums in Tuscany
Gardens in Tuscany
Forestry museums
Arboreta
Province of Arezzo
Forestry in Italy
1846 establishments in Italy